Deterenol (also known as Isopropylnorsynephrine and Isopropyloctopamine; trade name Betafrine) is a synthetic stimulant drug which acts as a beta agonist. It has been found as an ingredient of dietary supplement products, but is banned in most countries due to risk of cardiac arrest.

See also 
 Halostachine
 Isoprenaline
 Isopropylamphetamine
 Methylhexanamine
 Octopamine
 Phenpromethamine
 Synephrine
 Pre-workout

References 

Phenylethanolamines